Skip Stellrecht is an American voice and television actor, who was born and raised in Orange County, California. Growing up with more of an interest in surfing, sports, and music, he did not discover his interest in acting until after graduating from high school. He started with commercials, and soon started studying under the direction of some of the most well-respected teachers in Hollywood. He started auditioning and booking several stage roles throughout the Los Angeles area. and was a founding member of the Friends and Artist Theatre Ensemble.

After several television and movie roles, he stumbled onto voice acting, by mere accident, through a friend, and now enjoys a successful career in it today. His most notable roles are Might Guy from Naruto, Ryu from the Street Fighter animated films, and Vicious from Cowboy Bebop. He can also be heard lending his voice talents to such live-action shows as USA's Mr Robot, NBC's Grimm,  ABC's Once Upon a Time, and countless others. Along with his television work, he can also be heard in such movies as Godzilla, G.I. Joe, andTwilight.

Although voicing several video games throughout his career, Jutah Fate of Silent Bomber is still his favorite.

He has also been credited throughout the years as "Henry Douglas Grey", "Jack Aubree", and "Hank Wilspank".

Filmography

Anime 

 .hack//Liminality – Guard B
 Armitage III – Kevin Oldman/Ross Sylibus
 Brigadoon: Marin & Melan – Detective Wakai (Ep, 6-26, as Jack Aubree)
 Code Geass: Lelouch of the Rebellion – General Katase
 Cowboy Bebop – Vicious (as Henry Douglas Grey)
 Digimon Data Squad – Gaomon/Gaogamon/MachGaogamon/MirageGaogamon
 Dual! Parallel Trouble Adventure – Naoya Shiozaki
 Fushigi Yûgi – Hikitsu
 Ghost in the Shell: Stand Alone Complex – SIU Officer #1
 Giant Robo: The Animation – Tiger Man #2
 Great Teacher Onizuka – Toshiyuki Saejima (Ep. 34–43), Anko's Father (as Jack Aubree)
 Kikaider – Toru, Red Kikaider
 Marmalade Boy –  Satoshi Miwa, Shinichi Namura, others (credited as Jack Aubree)
 Mobile Suit Gundam: The 08th MS Team – Lunen
 Naruto – Might Guy, Ningame, Raijin, Itachi Uchiha (Eps. 29–30)
 Naruto: Shippuden – Might Guy, Kagami Uchiha, Captain of the Ghost Ship (Ep. 225)
 Reign: The Conqueror – Dinocrates, Phillipos (as Jack Aubree)
 Sol Bianca: The Legacy – Percy
 Street Fighter II V – Ryu (Animaze Dub)
 They Were Eleven – Thickhead
 Trigun – Benson (Ep. 19)
 Wolf's Rain – Zari

Animation 
 Adventure Time – Policeman (Episode: "Candy Streets"/uncredited)

Television 

 Babylon 5 – Customs Officer, Security Guard, Guard
 Beetleborgs Metallix – Ultimate Conqueror (voice)
 Buffy the Vampire Slayer – Agent Manetti
 China Beach – Cooper
 Confessions: Two Faces of Evil – Officer Harvey
 CSI: Miami – C.O. Winters
 Desperate Housewives – Booking Sergeant
 ER – Chaplain Miller
 Pacific Blue – O'Neill
 Providence – Police Officer
 Prey – Attendant
 Seven Days – Officer
 Sliders – Guard #1
 Star Trek: The Next Generation – Engineering Crewman (Season 1, Episode 2: "The Naked Now")
 The Bold and the Beautiful – Corky
 Tour of Duty – G.I. #2

Film 

 Akira – Additional voices (Animaze Dub; as Henry Douglas Grey)
 Appleseed – Colonel Hades, Kudoh (as Jack Aubree)
 Chameleon – Agent Two
 Multiplicity – Irate Football Parent
 Street Fighter II: The Animated Movie – Ryu (as Hank Smith)
 Street Fighter Alpha: The Animation – Ryu
 Suburban Commando – Soldier
 Succubus: Hell Bent – Cop #3
 The Nutcracker and the Mouseking – Additional voices
 Tough Guys – Reporter #1
 U.S. Air Marshals – W. Fritz Bean

Video games 

 Medal of Honor: Pacific Assault – Additional voices
 Naruto series – Might Guy
 Red Dead Redemption 2 – The Local Pedestrian Population
 Resident Evil: The Darkside Chronicles – Ben Bertolucci
 The Elder Scrolls Online – Additional voices (uncredited)

References

External links

Living people
American male television actors
American male video game actors
American male voice actors
20th-century American male actors
21st-century American male actors
Year of birth missing (living people)